David Campbell (born c. 1951) is a retired Canadian football player who played for the Edmonton Eskimos, Calgary Stampeders and Winnipeg Blue Bombers. He won the Grey Cup with Edmonton in 1975. He played college football at Queen's University.

References

1950s births
Living people
Edmonton Elks players
Canadian football defensive backs
Queen's Golden Gaels football players